The school of architecture of Nancy (also called EAN) is one of the twenty public schools of architecture in France, located at 2 rue Bastien-Lepage in Nancy. Created in 1969, the school depends on the French ministry for the Culture and the Communication since 1996.

The institution

The building

Research and theory

References

Architecture schools in France
Educational institutions established in 1969
1969 establishments in France